The Double Bed or Le Lit à deux places is a 1965 French and Italian film directed by Jean Delannoy and .

Cast
France Anglade	... 	Wife
Jacques Audoux	... 	(segment 3 "La répétition")
Dominique Boschero	... 	Colette - the fiancée (segment 3 "La répétition")
Lando Buzzanca
Carla Calò	... 	Mother
Jacques Charon	... 	the fiancé (segment 3 "La répétition")
Darry Cowl	... 	the fiancée's brother (segment 3 "La répétition")
Denise Gence	... 	Mamounette (segment 3 "La répétition")
Margaret Lee	... 	Carmela
Clément Michu	... 	(segment 3 "La répétition")
Jean Parédès	... 	the antiquary (segment 3 "La répétition")
Jean Richard	... 	Father
Michel Sardou	... 	(segment 3 "La répétition")
Michel Serrault	... 	Albert

External links
 
 

1965 films
1960s French-language films
French anthology films
Italian anthology films
Films with screenplays by Jean-Loup Dabadie
1960s French films